Automated test scoring may refer to:

 Automated essay scoring
 Optical mark recognition, commonly used to automate scoring of multiple-choice tests